The pineal gland, conarium, or epiphysis cerebri, is a small endocrine gland in the brain of most vertebrates. The pineal gland produces melatonin, a serotonin-derived hormone which modulates sleep patterns in both circadian and seasonal cycles. The shape of the gland resembles a pine cone, which gives it its name. The pineal gland is located in the epithalamus, near the center of the brain, between the two hemispheres, tucked in a groove where the two halves of the thalamus join. The pineal gland is one of the neuroendocrine secretory circumventricular organs in which capillaries are mostly permeable to solutes in the blood.

Nearly all vertebrate species possess a pineal gland.  The most important exception is a primitive vertebrate, the hagfish. Even in the hagfish, however, there may be a "pineal equivalent" structure in the dorsal diencephalon.  The lancelet Branchiostoma lanceolatum, an early chordate which is a close relative to vertebrates, also lacks a recognizable pineal gland.  The lamprey (another primitive vertebrate), however, does possess one.  A few more complex vertebrates have lost pineal glands over the course of their evolution.

The results of various scientific research in evolutionary biology, comparative neuroanatomy and neurophysiology have explained the evolutionary history (phylogeny) of the pineal gland in different vertebrate species. From the point of view of biological evolution, the pineal gland is a kind of atrophied photoreceptor. In the epithalamus of some species of amphibians and reptiles, it is linked to a light-sensing organ, known as the parietal eye, which is also called the pineal eye or third eye.

René Descartes believed the human pineal gland to be the "principal seat of the soul". Academic philosophy among his contemporaries considered the pineal gland as a neuroanatomical structure without special metaphysical qualities; science studied it as one endocrine gland among many.

Etymology
The word pineal, from Latin pinea (pine-cone), was first used in the late 17th century to refer to the cone shape of the brain gland.

Structure 
The pineal gland is a midline brain structure that is unpaired. It takes its name from its pine-cone shape. The gland is reddish-gray and about the size of a grain of rice (5–8 mm) in humans. The pineal gland, also called the pineal body, is part of the epithalamus, and lies between the laterally positioned thalamic bodies and behind the habenular commissure. It is located in the quadrigeminal cistern near to the corpora quadrigemina. It is also located behind the third ventricle and is bathed in cerebrospinal fluid supplied through a small pineal recess of the third ventricle which projects into the stalk of the gland.

Blood supply
Unlike most of the mammalian brain, the pineal gland is not isolated from the body by the blood–brain barrier system; it has profuse blood flow, second only to the kidney, supplied from the choroidal branches of the posterior cerebral artery.

Nerve supply
The pineal gland receives a sympathetic innervation from the superior cervical ganglion.  A parasympathetic innervation from the pterygopalatine and otic ganglia is also present.  Further, some nerve fibers penetrate into the pineal gland via the pineal stalk (central innervation).  Also, neurons in the trigeminal ganglion innervate the gland with nerve fibers containing the neuropeptide PACAP.

Microanatomy

The pineal body in humans consists of a lobular parenchyma of pinealocytes surrounded by connective tissue spaces. The gland's surface is covered by a pial capsule.

The pineal gland consists mainly of pinealocytes, but four other cell types have been identified. As it is quite cellular (in relation to the cortex and white matter), it may be mistaken for a neoplasm.

Development
The human pineal gland grows in size until about 1–2 years of age, remaining stable thereafter, although its weight increases gradually from puberty onwards. The abundant melatonin levels in children are believed to inhibit sexual development, and pineal tumors have been linked with precocious puberty. When puberty arrives, melatonin production is reduced.

Symmetry
In the zebrafish the pineal gland does not straddle the midline, but shows a left-sided bias. In humans, functional cerebral dominance is accompanied by subtle anatomical asymmetry.

Function 
One function of the pineal gland is to produce melatonin.  Melatonin has various functions in the central nervous system, the most important of which is to help modulate sleep patterns. Melatonin production is stimulated by darkness and inhibited by light. Light sensitive nerve cells in the retina detect light and send this signal to the suprachiasmatic nucleus (SCN), synchronizing the SCN to the day-night cycle. Nerve fibers then relay the daylight information from the SCN to the paraventricular nuclei (PVN), then to the spinal cord and via the sympathetic system to superior cervical ganglia (SCG), and from there into the pineal gland.

The compound pinoline is also claimed to be produced in the pineal gland; it is one of the beta-carbolines. This claim is subject to some controversy.

Regulation of the pituitary gland
Studies on rodents suggest that the pineal gland influences the pituitary gland's secretion of the sex hormones, follicle-stimulating hormone (FSH), and luteinizing hormone (LH). Pinealectomy performed on rodents produced no change in pituitary weight, but caused an increase in the concentration of FSH and LH within the gland. Administration of melatonin did not return the concentrations of FSH to normal levels, suggesting that the pineal gland influences pituitary gland secretion of FSH and LH through an undescribed transmitting molecule.

The pineal gland contains receptors for the regulatory neuropeptide, endothelin-1, which, when injected in picomolar quantities into the lateral cerebral ventricle, causes a calcium-mediated increase in pineal glucose metabolism.

Regulation of bone metabolism
Studies in mice suggest that the pineal-derived melatonin regulates new bone deposition. Pineal-derived melatonin mediates its action on the bone cells through MT2 receptors. This pathway could be a potential new target for osteoporosis treatment as the study shows the curative effect of oral melatonin treatment in a postmenopausal osteoporosis mouse model.

Clinical significance

Calcification
Calcification of the pineal gland is typical in young adults, and has been observed in children as young as two years of age. The internal secretions of the pineal gland are known to inhibit the development of the reproductive glands because when it is severely damaged in children, development of the sexual organs and the skeleton are accelerated. Pineal gland calcification is detrimental to its ability to synthesize melatonin and scientific literature presents inconclusive findings on whether it causes sleep problems.

The calcified gland is often seen in skull X-rays. Calcification rates vary widely by country and correlate with an increase in age, with calcification occurring in an estimated 40% of Americans by age seventeen. Calcification of the pineal gland is associated with corpora arenacea, also known as "brain sand".

Tumors
Tumors of the pineal gland are called pinealomas. These tumors are rare and 50% to 70% are germinomas that arise from sequestered embryonic germ cells. Histologically they are similar to testicular seminomas and ovarian dysgerminomas.

A pineal tumor can compress the superior colliculi and pretectal area of the dorsal midbrain, producing Parinaud's syndrome. Pineal tumors also can cause compression of the cerebral aqueduct, resulting in a noncommunicating hydrocephalus. Other manifestations are the consequence of their pressure effects and consist of visual disturbances, headache, mental deterioration, and sometimes dementia-like behaviour.

These neoplasms are divided into three categories: pineoblastomas, pineocytomas, and mixed tumors, based on their level of differentiation, which, in turn, correlates with their neoplastic aggressiveness. The clinical course of patients with pineocytomas is prolonged, averaging up to several years. The position of these tumors makes them difficult to remove surgically.

Other conditions 
The morphology of the pineal gland differs markedly in different pathological conditions. For instance, it is known that its volume is reduced both in obese patients as well as patients with primary insomnia.

Other animals
Most living vertebrates have pineal glands. It is likely that the common ancestor of all vertebrates had a pair of photosensory organs on the top of its head, similar to the arrangement in modern lampreys. Some extinct Devonian fishes have two parietal foramina in their skulls, suggesting an ancestral bilaterality of parietal eyes. The parietal eye and the pineal gland of living tetrapods are probably the descendants of the left and right parts of this organ, respectively.

During embryonic development, the parietal eye and the pineal organ of modern lizards and tuataras form together from a pocket formed in the brain ectoderm. The loss of parietal eyes in many living tetrapods is supported by developmental formation of a paired structure that subsequently fuses into a single pineal gland in developing embryos of turtles, snakes, birds, and mammals.

The pineal organs of mammals fall into one of three categories based on shape. Rodents have more structurally complex pineal glands than other mammals.

Crocodilians and some tropical lineages of mammals (some xenarthrans (sloths), pangolins, sirenians (manatees and dugongs), and some marsupials (sugar gliders)) have lost both their parietal eye and their pineal organ. Polar mammals, such as walruses and some seals, possess unusually large pineal glands.

All amphibians have a pineal organ, but some frogs and toads also have what is called a "frontal organ", which is essentially a parietal eye.

Pinealocytes in many non-mammalian vertebrates have a strong resemblance to the photoreceptor cells of the eye. Evidence from morphology and developmental biology suggests that pineal cells possess a common evolutionary ancestor with retinal cells.

Pineal cytostructure seems to have evolutionary similarities to the retinal cells of the lateral eyes. Modern birds and reptiles express the phototransducing pigment melanopsin in the pineal gland. Avian pineal glands are thought to act like the suprachiasmatic nucleus in mammals. The structure of the pineal eye in modern lizards and tuatara is analogous to the cornea, lens, and retina of the lateral eyes of vertebrates.

In most vertebrates, exposure to light sets off a chain reaction of enzymatic events within the pineal gland that regulates circadian rhythms. In humans and other mammals, the light signals necessary to set circadian rhythms are sent from the eye through the retinohypothalamic system to the suprachiasmatic nuclei (SCN) and the pineal gland.

The fossilized skulls of many extinct vertebrates have a pineal foramen (opening), which in some cases is larger than that of any living vertebrate. Although fossils seldom preserve deep-brain soft anatomy, the brain of the Russian fossil bird Cerebavis cenomanica from Melovatka, about 90 million years old, shows a relatively large parietal eye and pineal gland.

Society and culture

Seventeenth-century philosopher and scientist René Descartes was highly interested in anatomy and physiology. He discussed the pineal gland both in his first book, the Treatise of Man (written before 1637, but only published posthumously 1662/1664), and in his last book, The Passions of the Soul (1649) and he regarded it as "the principal seat of the soul and the place in which all our thoughts are formed". In the Treatise of Man, Descartes described conceptual models of man, namely creatures created by God, which consist of two ingredients, a body and a soul. In the Passions, Descartes split man up into a body and a soul and emphasized that the soul is joined to the whole body by "a certain very small gland situated in the middle of the brain's substance and suspended above the passage through which the spirits in the brain's anterior cavities communicate with those in its posterior cavities". Descartes attached significance to the gland because he believed it to be the only section of the brain to exist as a single part rather than one-half of a pair. Some of Descartes's basic anatomical and physiological assumptions were totally mistaken, not only by modern standards, but also in light of what was already known in his time.

The notion of a "pineal-eye" is central to the philosophy of the French writer Georges Bataille, which is analyzed at length by literary scholar Denis Hollier in his study Against Architecture. In this work Hollier discusses how Bataille uses the concept of a "pineal-eye" as a reference to a blind-spot in Western rationality, and an organ of excess and delirium. This conceptual device is explicit in his surrealist texts, The Jesuve and The Pineal Eye.

In the late 19th century Madame Blavatsky (who founded theosophy) identified the pineal gland with the Hindu concept of the third eye, or the Ajna chakra. This association is still popular today.

In the short story "From Beyond" by H. P. Lovecraft, a scientist creates an electronic device that emits a resonance wave, which stimulates an affected person's pineal gland, thereby allowing them to perceive planes of existence outside the scope of accepted reality, a translucent, alien environment that overlaps our own recognized reality. It was adapted as a film of the same name in 1986. The 2013 horror film Banshee Chapter is heavily influenced by this short story.

History
The secretory activity of the pineal gland is only partially understood. Its location deep in the brain suggested to philosophers throughout history that it possesses particular importance. This combination led to its being regarded as a "mystery" gland with mystical, metaphysical, and occult theories surrounding its perceived functions.

The pineal gland was originally believed to be a "vestigial remnant" of a larger organ. In 1917, it was known that extract of cow pineals lightened frog skin. Dermatology professor Aaron B. Lerner and colleagues at Yale University, hoping that a substance from the pineal might be useful in treating skin diseases, isolated and named the hormone melatonin in 1958. The substance did not prove to be helpful as intended, but its discovery helped solve several mysteries such as why removing the rat's pineal accelerated ovary growth, why keeping rats in constant light decreased the weight of their pineals, and why pinealectomy and constant light affect ovary growth to an equal extent; this knowledge gave a boost to the then new field of chronobiology. Of the endocrine organs, the function of the pineal gland was the last discovered.

Additional images
The pineal body is labeled in these images.

See also 
 Pineal gland cyst

References

External links 

Circadian rhythm
Endocrine system
Epithalamus
Glands
Human head and neck
Sleep physiology